Balakhani is a rural locality (a selo) and the administrative center of Balakhansky Selsoviet, Untsukulsky District, Republic of Dagestan, Russia. The population was 2,164 as of 2010. There are 11 streets.

Geography 
Balakhani is located 28 km south of Shamilkala (the district's administrative centre) by road. Irganay is the nearest rural locality.

References 

Rural localities in Untsukulsky District